Ardentallen is a village in Argyll and Bute, Scotland.

References 

Villages in Argyll and Bute